HMS Naiad was a  light cruiser of the Royal Navy which served in the Second World War. She was sunk in action on 11 March 1942 south of Crete in the Mediterranean Sea.

History
She was built by Hawthorn Leslie and Company (Hebburn-on-Tyne, UK), her keel being laid down on 26 August 1937. She was launched on 3 February 1939, and commissioned 24 July 1940.

She initially joined the Home Fleet and was used for ocean trade protection duties. As part of the 15th Cruiser Squadron she took part in operations against German raiders following the sinking of the armed merchant cruiser  in November 1940. During that month she was involved in the destruction of the German weather ship Hinrich Freese off Jan Mayen. By May 1941 Naiad was with Force H in the Mediterranean on Malta convoy operations, and flagship of the 15th Cruiser Squadron. Naiad participated in the Crete operations, where she was badly damaged by German aircraft. For the remainder of her service, she was in the Mediterranean, mostly connected with the continual attempts to resupply Malta.

In March 1942 she sailed from Alexandria to attack an Italian cruiser that had been reported damaged.

References

External links

HMS Naiad Association

 

Dido-class cruisers
Ships built on the River Tyne
1939 ships
World War II cruisers of the United Kingdom
Ships sunk by German submarines in World War II
World War II shipwrecks in the Mediterranean Sea
Maritime incidents in March 1942